Referees in the National Basketball Association (NBA) oversee 120 pre-season games, 1,260 regular season games, and four rounds of playoff matches.  These officials "oversee competition in real-time between 10 exceptional athletes, making calls with 95% accuracy."

In March 2015, the NBA began issuing Last Two Minutes reports that detail the performance of referees at the ends of games which the point differential is within five points with two minutes or less remaining in the contest.

Officials
For the 2022–23 NBA season, there are 74 staff officials and 8 non-staff officials:

Staff officials

 Ray Acosta, #54
 Brandon Adair, #67
 Bennie Adams, #47
 Brent Barnaky, #36
 Curtis Blair, #74
 Matt Boland, #18
 Tony Brothers, #25
 Tony Brown, #6
 Nick Buchert, #3
 John Butler, #53
 James Capers, #19
 Derrick Collins, #11
 John Conley, #79
 Sean Corbin, #33
 Kevin Cutler, #34
 Mousa Dagher, #28
 Eric Dalen, #37
 Marc Davis, #8
 JB DeRosa, #62
 Mitchell Ervin, #27
 Cheryl Flores, #91
 Tyler Ford, #39
 Brian Forte, #45
 Scott Foster, #48
 Pat Fraher, #26
 Jacyn Goble, #68
 John Goble, #30
 Jason Goldenberg, #35
 Nate Green, #65
 David Guthrie, #16
 Lauren Holtkamp-Sterling, #7
 Robert Hussey, #85
 Simone Jelks, #81
 Matt Kallio, #88
 Bill Kennedy, #55
 Courtney Kirkland, #61
 Marat Kogut, #32
 Karl Lane, #77
 Eric Lewis, #42
 Mark Lindsay, #29
 Tre Maddox, #23
 Ed Malloy, #14
 Suyash Mehta, #82
 Dannica Mosher, #89
 Rodney Mott, #71
 Ashley Moyer-Gleich, #13
 Matt Myers, #43
 Andy Nagy, #83
 Brett Nansel, #44
 J.T. Orr, #72
 Gediminas Petraitis, #50
 Phenizee Ransom, #70
 Derek Richardson, #63
 Natalie Sago, #9
 Jenna Schroeder, #84
 Brandon Schwab, #86
 Danielle Scott, #87
 Evan Scott, #78
 Kevin Scott, #24
 Aaron Smith, #51
 Michael Smith, #38
 Jonathan Sterling, #17
 Ben Taylor, #46
 Dedric Taylor, #21
 Josh Tiven, #58
 Scott Twardoski, #52
 Justin Van Duyne, #64
 Scott Wall, #31
 CJ Washington, #12
 Tom Washington, #49
 James Williams, #60
 Leon Wood, #40
 Sean Wright, #4
 Zach Zarba, #15

Non-staff officials

 Brent Haskill, #92
 Intae Hwang, #96
 Tyler Mirkovich, #97
 Sha’Rae Mitchell, #98
 Pat O’Connell, #90
 JD Ralls, #94
 Jenna Reneau, #93
 Tyler Ricks, #95

References

NBA referees
 
National Bask

External links